Hjalti Skeggiason (Old Norse and Modern Icelandic: ;;) was an Icelandic chieftain who supported Gizurr the White for the introduction of Christianity in Iceland, on the Althing in 1000.

Later he spent time with the Norwegian king Olaf the Stout and accompanied Björn Stallare on his diplomatic mission to Ragnvald Ulfsson in Västergötland and to Olof Skötkonung in Uppsala.

Snorri Sturluson's detailed account of this voyage is probably based on an account made by Hjalti after his return to Iceland.

Sources
An article in Nordisk familjebok

10th-century Vikings
10th-century Icelandic people
Goðar
11th-century Vikings